The Women's mass start competition at the Biathlon World Championships 2021 was held on 21 February 2021.

Results
The race was started at 12:30.

References

Women's mass start